David Reid was a Scottish footballer who played for Hibernian and Motherwell. He finished as the top scorer in Scottish Football League Division One in the 1902–03 season, scoring 14 goals as Hibernian won the championship for the first time in their history.

References

Hibernian F.C. players
Scottish Football League players
Scottish footballers
Year of birth missing
Year of death missing
Scottish league football top scorers
Association football forwards
Motherwell F.C. players